Hristiyan Vasilev (born 5 December 1997) is a Bulgarian professional footballer who plays as a goalkeeper for Bulgarian Second League club Yantra Gabrovo.

Career

Yantra Gabrovo
A product of the youth academy of Slavia Sofia, Vasilev was loaned out to Yantra Gabrovo in January 2016.

Vitosha Bistritsa
In June 2016, he joined Vitosha Bistritsa. He made his debut for the team on 8 August 2016 in a league match against Ludogorets Razgrad II keeping a clean sheet. On 2 June 2017 he kept a clean sheet in the play-off match against Neftochimic won by Vitosha with 1:0 and won promotion to the top division for the first time in their history.

On 17 July 2017 he signed his first long-term professional contract with the team. He completed his professional First League debut on 30 July 2017 in match against Levski Sofia. Vasilev left the team in June 2020.

Beroe
In July 2020, Vassilev joined Beroe Stara Zagora.

International career
Vasilev made his debut for Bulgaria U21 on 8 June 2017 in a friendly match against Georgia U21.

He received his first call up for the Bulgaria on 12 November for the UEFA Nations League matches against Finland on 15 November 2020 and Republic of Ireland on 18 November.

Career statistics

Club

References

External links
 

Living people
1997 births
Bulgarian footballers
Association football goalkeepers
FC Yantra Gabrovo players
FC Vitosha Bistritsa players
PFC Beroe Stara Zagora players
FC Tsarsko Selo Sofia players
First Professional Football League (Bulgaria) players
People from Gabrovo